Reevesia is a genus of flowering plant in the family Malvaceae.

Species
It contains around 25 species, including:
 Reevesia formosana
 Reevesia rotundifolia

References

External links

Helicteroideae
Malvaceae genera
Taxonomy articles created by Polbot